Synetic GmbH was a German video game company specialising in racing games. The company was founded in 1996 in Gütersloh by five former members of Ascaron. All five original members were still working for the company until the company was liquidated on 6 May 2014. Although the company with its team of eight employees was rather small and its games are virtually unknown outside of Germany, their titles are among the most popular racing games in Germany and are consistently among Germany's best-selling games.

While originally only developing games for Windows PCs, Synetic's later releases (starting with 2003's Mercedes Benz World Racing) were also available for a selection of consoles.

On 31 March 2014, Synetic ceased the production of video games.

Games

References

External links
Official Synetic website
Official Synetic forum
Playlogic's World Racing 2 website
Modding tools website
Addons download website

German companies established in 1996
Video game companies established in 1996
Video game companies disestablished in 2014
Defunct video game companies of Germany
Racing video games
German companies disestablished in 2014